(born Tokyo, 13 July 1957) is a former Japanese rugby union player. He played as prop. Currently, he works for the non-profit organisation Heroes.

Career
Yasumi started his rugby career while playing for the rugby team of Hozen Senior High School, the college he attended.
After graduating, in 1985, he joined Toyota Motors to play the All-Japan Rugby Company Championship.
His first international cap was during the match against Canada, at Burnaby Lake, on 7 June 1986.
He was also part of the 1987 Rugby World Cup squad, playing only the match against USA, where USA won against Japan for 21-18. His last international cap was in the match against New Zealand, at Osaka, on 25 October 1987, earning 3 international caps.

Notes

External links

1957 births
Living people
Rugby union props
Japanese rugby union players
Japan international rugby union players
Sportspeople from Tokyo